Kristor Lybecker Brødsgaard (born 1979) is a Danish double bassist known from collaborations with jazz guitarist Tao Højgaard and within JazzKamikaze.

Career 
Brødsgaard picked up the double bass in 1992, and was awarded the «Berlingske Tidendes Rytmiske Musikkonkurrence», including bassist Niels-Henning Ørsted Pedersen in the jury. Within the Scandinavian quintet JazzKamikaze he participates on several album releases and appeared at the international jazz festivals Kongsberg Jazzfestival, Moldejazz, North Sea Jazz Festival, Bangkok Jazz Festival, Rochester Jazz Festival as well as being part of the opening of the annual Rio Carnival in Rio de Janeiro.

Honors 
1999: Winner of the «Berlingske Tidendes Rytmiske Musikkonkurrence»
2005: Ung Jazz award of the JazzDanmark
2005: Young Nordic Jazz Comets
2007: Spearhead in the International Launch of Danish Jazz between 2007-2009

Discography 

Within JazzKamikaze
2005: Mission I, (Stunt)
2007: Traveling at the speed of sound, (Stunt) 
2008: Emerging pilots EP, (SevenSeas)
2009: The revolution's in your hands EP, (SevenSeas)
2010: Supersonic revolutions, (SevenSeas)
2012: The Return of JazzKamikaze (Stunt)

With other
2003: I 508 Farver (Cope), within Prinsens Orkester
2004: "Trioscope" (Cope), within Trioscope
2004: "Play Attention" (Calibrated), within Jan Lippert Ensemble
2005: This Is Beyond Criticism (Useless Salvation), within Geeza
2006: "Protestsange.dk" (Edel), within various artists
2006: "Playing" (Cope), within Jan Lippert Ensemble
2009: "Stilletto" (Playground), within Karen
2012: "Deeper Than Roots" (Target), within Aisha
2013: "Catching the Wave" (Stunt), within Veronica Mortensen Band

As featured artist
2011: Tribute (Carsten Lindholm), with Carsten Lindholm (9th Gate)

References 

Danish jazz double-bassists
Male double-bassists
Jazz double-bassists
Avant-garde jazz musicians
Musicians from Copenhagen
1979 births
People from Rudersdal Municipality
Living people
21st-century double-bassists
21st-century male musicians
Male jazz musicians
JazzKamikaze members